Pamfil is a Romanian given name and surname. Notable people with the name include:

 Pamfil Polonic (1858–1943), Romanian archaeologist and topographer
 Pamfil Yurkevich (1826–1874), Ukrainian philosopher
 Radu Pamfil (1951–2009), Romanian football player

Romanian-language surnames